The yellow-bellied bush warbler (Horornis acanthizoides), also known as the yellowish-bellied bush warbler, is a species of bush warbler (family Cettiidae). It was formerly included in the "Old World warbler" assemblage.

It is found on mainland China and Taiwan. Hume's bush warbler was formerly considered conspecific.

References 

yellow-bellied bush warbler
Birds of China
Birds of Taiwan
yellow-bellied bush warbler